Andrew Lapihuska (November 1, 1922 – February 17, 1996) was a professional baseball player.  He was a right-handed pitcher over parts of two seasons (1942–43) with the Philadelphia Phillies. For his career, he compiled an 0–2 record, with a 7.04 earned run average, and 8 strikeouts in 23 innings pitched.

Lapihuska was born in the Delmont section of Maurice River Township, New Jersey, and died in Millville, New Jersey, at the age of 73.

References

External links

1922 births
1996 deaths
Philadelphia Phillies players
Major League Baseball pitchers
Baseball players from New Jersey
Allentown Wings players
Trenton Packers players
Birmingham Barons players
Utica Blue Sox players
People from Maurice River Township, New Jersey
Sportspeople from Cumberland County, New Jersey
Millville Senior High School alumni